Allyl methyl sulfide is an organosulfur compound with the chemical formula CH2=CHCH2SCH3. The molecule features two functional groups, an allyl (CH2=CHCH2) and a sulfide. It is a colourless liquid with a strong odor characteristic of alkyl sulfides. It is a metabolite of garlic, and "garlic breath" is attributed to its presence.
 
It is prepared by the reaction of allyl chloride with sodium hydroxide and methanethiol.
CH2=CHCH2Cl + NaOH (aq) + CH3SH → CH2=CHCH2SCH3 + NaCl + H2O

References

Thioethers
Allyl compounds